St. Johns Park is a public park in north Portland, Oregon's St. Johns neighborhood, in the United States. The  park was acquired in 1941.

The St. Johns Community Center is located within the park.

See also
 List of parks in Portland, Oregon

References

External links
 

1941 establishments in Oregon
Parks in Portland, Oregon
Protected areas established in 1941
St. Johns, Portland, Oregon